Ana Kristina Gasteyer (born May 4, 1967) is an American actress, comedian, and singer. Gasteyer was a cast member on the NBC sketch comedy series Saturday Night Live from 1996 to 2002. She has since starred in such sitcoms as ABC's Suburgatory, TBS's People of Earth, NBC's American Auto, and the film Mean Girls.

Early life 
Gasteyer was born in Washington, D.C., the daughter of Mariana Roumell-Gasteyer, an artist, and Phil Gasteyer, a lobbyist who later became the mayor of Corrales, New Mexico. Gasteyer grew up on Capitol Hill, three blocks from the Capitol. Her maternal grandparents were Romanian and Greek. She graduated from Sidwell Friends School. She enrolled as a music major at Northwestern University, and graduated from Northwestern University School of Communication in 1989.

Career 
Gasteyer developed comedy experience with the Los Angeles improv – sketch comedy group The Groundlings. She played small roles on Seinfeld (as a doomed customer of The Soup Nazi) as well as on the shows Party of Five, Frasier, Hope & Gloria, and NYPD Blue. In 1996, Gasteyer joined the cast of Saturday Night Live. Among her most popular characters were high school music teacher Bobbie Mohan-Culp, National Public Radio Delicious Dish host Margaret Jo McCullen, Lilith Fair feminist singer Cinder Calhoun, and her impressions of Martha Stewart and Celine Dion. In 2000, she and Chris Parnell auditioned to succeed Colin Quinn as co-anchors of the news parody segment Weekend Update, but the positions ultimately went to Tina Fey and Jimmy Fallon.

After six seasons, Gasteyer left SNL in 2002. Subsequently, she appeared in various television programs, films and stage productions. In 2004, Gasteyer played the mother of the main character Cady Heron (Lindsay Lohan) in the feature film Mean Girls, written by SNL castmate Tina Fey. The film also featured other former SNL castmates, including Fey, Tim Meadows, and Amy Poehler. Gasteyer appeared in the 2005 Showtime movie musical Reefer Madness as Mae, the doomed girlfriend of Jack and owner of the Reefer Den.

Gasteyer starred in a revival of The Threepenny Opera on Broadway as Mrs. Peachum, along with Jim Dale, Alan Cumming, and Cyndi Lauper. The production ran from March 24 through June 25, 2006.

On June 24, 2005, Gasteyer originated the role of Elphaba in the Chicago sit-down production of the musical Wicked, alongside Kate Reinders as Glinda. The production opened July 13, 2005. Gasteyer was nominated for a Jefferson Award for her performance. She played her final performance on January 22, 2006, replaced by her standby Kristy Cates. She later reprised the role in the Broadway production from October 10, 2006, through January 7, 2007, replacing Eden Espinosa.

On April 12, 2007, the media announced that Gasteyer had joined the cast of the then-new musical Writing Arthur for the 2007 New Works Festival for TheatreWorks in California, which ran from April 14 to April 22. Gasteyer performed in Chicago in the Stephen Sondheim musical Passion at Chicago Shakespeare Theater from October 2, 2007, through November 11, 2007.

She was originally cast as Gloria in the 2008 Encores! Summer Series production of Damn Yankees, but due to injury during rehearsals, she was replaced by Megan Lawrence. Gasteyer took part in the reading of the Broadway musical version of The First Wives Club in January 2009.

She starred as Kitty Dean in the Broadway play The Royal Family which began performances at the Samuel J. Friedman Theatre on September 15, 2009, and officially opened on October 8, 2009. The show concluded its run on December 13, 2009. Gasteyer also starred as Frisco Kate Fothergill in the City Centers Encores! production of Girl Crazy, running from November 19 to November 22, 2009.

She returned to Saturday Night Live for a special Mother's Day episode on May 8, 2010, and for another Mother's Day episode on May 11, 2012.

Gasteyer appeared in season eight of Curb Your Enthusiasm as Larry David's girlfriend.

From 2011 to 2014, Gasteyer co-starred as Sheila Shay on the ABC comedy series Suburgatory, and, as of March 2013, she was a spokeswoman for the Weight Watchers diet plan.

In 2014, taking advantage of her training as a singer, Gasteyer recorded and released I'm Hip, an album of jazz standards including "One Mint Julep". In 2015, she played Mimi Schwinn in the New York City Center Encores! Off-Broadway revival of the musical A New Brain, also appearing on the cast recording.

From 2016 to 2017, Gasteyer had a starring role on TBS's cult hit People of Earth as the leader of an alien abductee support group.

In October 2019, she released the holiday album Sugar & Booze which was later accompanied by an Audible Original comedy piece titled Holiday Greetings from Sugar and Booze, featuring Gasteyer along with Maya Rudolph, Oscar Nunez, and Patti LuPone. Gasteyer later appeared as a contestant on the second season of The Masked Singer under the guise of "Tree", ultimately finishing the competition in sixth place.

In February 2020, it was announced that Gasteyer will play Katherine Hastings in the NBC comedy pilot American Auto, written by Justin Spitzer. The show's production was delayed due to the COVID-19 pandemic and skipped the step to premiere in the 2021–2022 broadcast season. In September and October 2020, she voiced a red panda named Nut in an adult animated series titled Magical Girl Friendship Squad.

Personal life 
Gasteyer married Charlie McKittrick in 1996. They have two children.

Saturday Night Live characters

Original characters
 Bobbie Mohan-Culp, the operatic-voiced high school music teacher (with Will Ferrell)
 Margaret Jo McCullen, co-host of the NPR radio show Delicious Dish (with Molly Shannon)
 Gemini's Twin singer Jonette (with Maya Rudolph)
 Cinder Calhoun, a politically correct Lilith Fair singer
 Fast-talking MTV VJ Kincaid
 Daytime talk show hostess of Pretty Living, Gayle Gleeson

Celebrity impressions
 Martha Stewart
 Céline Dion (on The Celine Dion Show)
 Katherine Harris
 Joy Behar
 Joan Rivers
 Sally Jesse Raphael
 Elizabeth Dole
 Kathy Griffin
 Carrie Donovan (Vogue style editor featured in the Old Navy commercials)
 Bea Arthur
 Barbra Streisand (auditioning for Star Wars)
 Helen Thomas
 Hillary Clinton             
 Mia Farrow  
 Victoria Beckham
 Geri Halliwell
 Christina Aguilera
 Laura Schlessinger
 Debbie Matenopoulos
 Elizabeth Hurley
 Lynda Lopez
 Lisa Kudrow (as Phoebe Buffay on Friends)
 Jewel
 Cokie Roberts 
 Madonna
 Andie MacDowell             
 Nancy Grace
 Ann B. Davis             
 Cynthia Nixon  (as Miranda Hobbes  on Sex and the City)     
 Glenn Close
 Renee O'Connor (as Gabrielle  on Xena: Warrior Princess) 
 Darva Conger

Acting credits

Film

Television

Broadway

Web

References

External links 
 
 
 
 

1967 births
20th-century American actresses
21st-century American actresses
20th-century American comedians
21st-century American comedians
Living people
Actresses from Washington, D.C.
American impressionists (entertainers)
American musical theatre actresses
American stage actresses
American television actresses
American voice actresses
American people of Romanian descent
American people of Greek descent
Northwestern University School of Communication alumni
Sidwell Friends School alumni
American women comedians
American film actresses
American sketch comedians  
American women singers
Comedians from Washington, D.C.
Disney people